Regina Marie "Jenna" Fischer (born March 7, 1974) is an American actress best known for her portrayal of Pam Beesly on the NBC sitcom The Office (2005–2013), for which she was nominated for the Primetime Emmy Award for Outstanding Supporting Actress in a Comedy Series in 2007. She was also a producer for the show's final season.

Since then, Fischer has appeared in such films as Blades of Glory (2007), Walk Hard: The Dewey Cox Story (2007), The Promotion (2008), Hall Pass (2011), and The Giant Mechanical Man (2012), a film directed by her husband, Lee Kirk. She also appeared as Rhonda McNeil in the NBC comedy-drama series You, Me and the Apocalypse. Fischer also starred in the ABC sitcom Splitting Up Together (2018–2019). She is currently the co-host of the podcast Office Ladies.

Fischer's first book, The Actor's Life: A Survival Guide, was published in November 2017.

Early life
Fischer was born in Fort Wayne, Indiana, and raised in St. Louis, Missouri. Her mother, Anne (née Miller), is a history teacher; her father, James E. Fischer, is an engineer. She has one younger sister, Emily, a third grade teacher. She first performed at the age of six, when she participated in an acting workshop taught by her mother at Henry School in St. Louis, a workshop also attended by actor Sean Gunn, with whom she grew up.

She later attended Pierremont Elementary School in Manchester, Missouri, and Nerinx Hall High School, a private all-girls Catholic school in Webster Groves, Missouri. She holds a Bachelor of Arts in theater, as well as a minor in journalism, from Truman State University, where she originally enrolled as a pre-law history major.

Career

Early work and LoliLove
While attending college at Truman State University in Missouri, Fischer performed with a touring Murder Mystery Dinner Theatre group. Upon her move to Los Angeles in 1998, Fischer began performing Commedia dell'arte with the Zoo District Theatre Company. She was noticed by a talent agent because of her appearance in a musical theater adaptation of the 1922 film Nosferatu with Zoo District Theatre Company. This led to her signing a contract with that agent.

Fischer struggled to break into film and television. Her first paying film role was in a sex education video for psychiatric patients upon their release from Ronald Reagan UCLA Medical Center. Three years elapsed from the time she arrived in California until Fischer landed her first televised speaking role. She played the part of a waitress on the television sitcom Spin City in 2001. Fischer appeared in bit parts in small independent films during her early years in Southern California, including Employee of the Month, Lucky 13, and The Specials. On television, she performed as a guest on shows including Cold Case, Miss Match, Off Centre, Six Feet Under, Strong Medicine, That '70s Show, Undeclared, and What I Like About You. 

While her film career was slowly taking off, Fischer took matters into her own hands, writing, directing and starring in her own mockumentary, LolliLove, her only directing credit. The film co-starred her then-husband James Gunn, as well as friends Linda Cardellini, Judy Greer, Lloyd Kaufman, and Jason Segel. She began participating in The Artist's Way, a self-led creativity seminar in book form. "From doing that book I got this idea... When we started it, it wasn't even supposed to be a real movie. It was just going to be an improv project for James and I to amuse ourselves with." Utilizing a camera she gave Gunn as a wedding present, she filmed preliminary improvisational interviews with her friends in the faux documentary format that would later bring her fame on The Office. "I really feel it was divine intervention that I chose to work in this medium for a year," she said in an interview. "It was the super best practice I could have ever gotten for the possibility of being on the show."

LolliLove premiered at the St. Louis International Film Festival, in the hometown of Fischer and Gunn, in November 2004 and was also shown at the TromaDance Film Festival. For her role in the film, Fischer was awarded a Screen Actors Guild Emerging Actor Award. Despite the film's contribution to her career, she admitted to a St. Louis arts and entertainment magazine that the experience dissuaded her from any future directing: "The directing was exhausting and the writing was painful. It was very difficult to direct and star in a movie. We also had a very small crew so I did a lot of things a normal director doesn't have to do, like make the props and serve lunch. I was simultaneously getting into character, going over my lines, set dressing the next shot, coaching an actor, and brainstorming with my DP [cinematographer]. I'm good at multitasking, but that was too much for me. I couldn't enjoy any one part the way I would have liked. I think I'll stick to acting."

The Office and career expansion 
In 2005, after a succession of mostly improvised auditions similar to her LolliLove experience, Fischer landed the role of Pam Beesly on what would become the NBC hit The Office, based on the original BBC series. Before her initial audition, casting director Allison Jones advised Fischer, "Dare to bore me." Fischer herself spent several years working as a receptionist and administrative assistant in Los Angeles offices, much like her television counterpart, while struggling to achieve success, and thus felt she was well suited to the role. "I'm so attached to Pam's journey," she told NPR in 2009. "I just love playing this character so, so much." Soon after The Office premiered, Fischer was focused on the show's success; in an April 2005 interview with her alma mater's student newspaper, she said: "Honestly it would be great to get to play Pam for a long, long time.... I don't have real big aspirations to be a movie star. I would love to be on a long-running hit TV show. You end up playing a defining role." She was chosen by the cast of The Office to give an acceptance speech on behalf of the show for their win of Outstanding Comedy Series at the 2006 Emmy Awards, stating: "We love working together and being together; and as an ensemble… this group struggled for a long time as non working actors, like 8, 12, 15, 20 years… so we’re always grateful and don’t take it for granted”. At the 2007 Emmy Awards she received a nomination for the Primetime Emmy Award for Outstanding Supporting Actress in a Comedy Series. 

Fischer appeared on Bravo's Celebrity Poker Showdown in 2006, participating in the show's eighth tournament, shot in New Orleans, Louisiana, and playing for Catholic Charities' Tsunami Relief. In 2007, Fischer starred in the music video for Willie Wisely's single "Through Any Window", directed by longtime friend John Cabrera; the opportunity arose because she knew Wisely from work he had done on soundtracks for LolliLove and Tromeo and Juliet, one of her husband's films. In December of that same year, during the Writers Guild of America strike, Fischer appeared at Sacred Fools Theater Company in episode 25 of Darque Magick, a serialized play written and directed by Jenelle Riley. In 2006, she co-starred in her then-husband's film Slither, and in 2007, she filmed supporting roles in The Brothers Solomon, with Will Arnett and Will Forte, Blades of Glory, with Will Ferrell, Jon Heder, Amy Poehler and Will Arnett, and Walk Hard: The Dewey Cox Story, alongside John C. Reilly, with whom she co-starred again in 2008's The Promotion, also starring Seann William Scott. 

In 2009, Fischer completed filming on the films Solitary Man and A Little Help, with the latter opening in the summer of 2010 at the Seattle International Film Festival. Also that summer, she completed filming on the Farrelly brothers comedy Hall Pass, which was released in February 2011. Fischer was named as producer of the mid-August through October 2010 run of the critically acclaimed play Sad Happy Sucker, written by her husband Lee Kirk and directed by friend Sean Gunn; the play previously ran as a theatre workshop in February and March 2007. In July 2009, Fischer played left field for the National League team in the Taco Bell All-Star Legends and Celebrity Softball Game as part of the MLB All-Star Week festivities, held at Busch Stadium in St. Louis, Missouri, where she grew up. Fischer was named an official spokeswoman for Proactiv Skincare Solutions that same year and was announced as the voice behind the Wisconsin Milk Marketing Board Grilled Cheese Academy website in 2010. In March 2010, Fischer returned to the area to co-chair an annual auction for Nerinx Hall High School, her alma mater. At the event, she auctioned off a set visit to The Office and multiple autographed props from the show.

After finishing The Office, Fischer starred in the off-Broadway play Reasons to Be Happy, written and directed by Neil LaBute, which ran from May to June 2013. Fischer starred in the world premiere of Steve Martin's comedy Meteor Shower at the Old Globe Theatre in San Diego, California, from July 30 to September 18, 2016. She also worked alongside actors Greg Germann, Alexandra Henrikson, and Josh Stamberg. In 2018, Fischer was interviewed on Jimmy Kimmel Live wearing only a towel and jeans due to a last minute wardrobe malfunction when the zipper broke on her dress. The actress boldly came out on stage carrying the dress she intended to wear and commented to the audience "I'm mentally freaking out [because] I'm on a talk show in a towel, but I'm physically very comfortable."

On September 11, 2019, Fischer announced that she and Angela Kinsey would be cohosting a weekly The Office rewatch podcast called Office Ladies, which premiered on October 16. The first episode of Office Ladies was released October 16, 2019. Guests on the podcast have included actors Rainn Wilson, John Krasinski, and Oscar Nunez, and producers/directors Greg Daniels, Paul Feig, and Ken Kwapis. Fischer and Kinsey continued to record the podcast during the COVID-19 pandemic by producing it from their own homesrecording segments in their closets. They have since returned to recording in-person. On January 21, 2021, Office Ladies won the 2021 iHeartRadio Podcast of the Year award.

In February 2021, Fischer, along with her Office Ladies co-host, Angela Kinsey, announced that they would be releasing a new book called The Office BFFs. The book was released on May 17, 2022 documenting stories about their friendship and time on the show, featuring pictures and stories. The book was published by HarperCollins Publishing company and is available to purchase as a hardcover, e-book or audiobook.

Personal life

After Fischer moved to Los Angeles, her childhood friend Sean Gunn helped her get a part in a showcase and then introduced her to his brother, screenwriter James Gunn. That small part in a showcase also led to Fischer getting her first manager. Fischer married James Gunn on October 7, 2000. They announced their separation in September 2007, and they divorced in 2008. In 2010, Fischer helped Gunn with casting Rainn Wilson, her The Office co-star, in Gunn's film Super.

In June 2009, Fischer's engagement to screenwriter Lee Kirk was announced, and they married on July 3, 2010. The couple's wedding ceremony was officiated by Jeff Probst, whom they met at an Emmys party and later became good friends. Fischer and Kirk announced her pregnancy with their first child in May 2011; the pregnancy coincided with her character's second pregnancy on The Offices eighth season. In September 2011, Fischer gave birth to their son. Fischer gave birth to their second child, a daughter, in May 2014.

Fischer is passionate about animal rescue, and she is involved with the Los Angeles organizations Kitten Rescue and Rescue Rover. Before The Office, she worked for three years doing hands-on rescue work for the organizations. She regularly fosters cats and hosted Kitten Rescue's annual Fur Ball Gala in 2008, 2009, and 2010.

On April 17, 2018, Fischer was a guest of an event at DePauw University that was interrupted by students who were protesting against the allegedly racist, homophobic and antisemitic slurs found on campus. In response to the protests, Fischer announced she would donate the money she received from DePauw to the NAACP, the Anti-Defamation League, and The Trevor Project.

In 2017, as part of season 1 of Houzz TV, Fischer gifted her sister Emily Elmore a surprise renovation of her kitchen, lounge and dining room in admiration of her sister's work as a teacher and community-based service worker. Fischer commented with an emotional statement: "I want to do this for Emily because she does so much and asks for so little—my sister is my hero". On February 28, 2023, Fischer was announced to play Mrs. Heron in the film adaptation of the Broadway musical Mean Girls, based on the 2004 film of the same name.

Filmography

Film

Television

Awards and nominations

References

External links

 
 

1974 births
20th-century American actresses
21st-century American actresses
Actresses from St. Louis
People from St. Louis
American film actresses
American television actresses
Living people
Truman State University alumni
Actors from Fort Wayne, Indiana
People from Fort Wayne, Indiana
Actresses from Indiana
American women podcasters
American podcasters